The Assumption College of Davao also referred to by its acronym ACD is a private Catholic basic and higher education institution run by the Missionaries of the Assumption in Davao City, Philippines. It was established by the Daughters of Mary of the Assumption (FMA) in 1958. Formerly named the Assumption School of Davao (ASD), it was renamed the Assumption College of Davao (ACD) in 1998 on its 40th anniversary.

History
When the local church of Davao was starting to rebuild and reorganize after the Second World War, Archbishop Clovis Thibault wanted the religious groups to take part in the reconstruction by establishing centers of learning in the archdiocese that would offer solid and formal education to children from all walks of life.

Acting on this invitation, two members of the Daughters of Mary of the Assumption or F.M.A., Sr. Elodie Marie Richard (Mother del Annunciation) and Sr. Oveline Doucet (Sr. Gaetace) of Campbellton, New Brunswick, Canada came over. In obedience to their charism of the preferential option for the marginalized poor, the first school that the FMA organized after their arrival in 1954 was the Assumption School of Nabunturan in Davao de Oro Province. Later, it was renamed Assumption College of Nabunturan.

In 1958, on an "open, swampy and desolate" parcel of land in the suburb community of Agdao, the F.M.A. opened a city-based school, the Assumption Academy of Davao. The academy started its operation as an exclusive school for girls with elementary and high school departments. At the opening of classes, it registered a total of 170 enrollees, consisting of 84 elementary pupils and 86 high school students. The elementary offered only Grades I, V and VI with one section in each level. The succeeding years saw the expansion of its curricular offering to several levels of learning to meet the needs of the youth and the community. Soon after, it was granted permission by the Ministry of Education, Culture and Sports to open the college department in 1961. The college started with forty-four (44) students who enrolled in the first year level. However, barely twelve years later it had to be phased out due to lack of teachers holding master's degrees, among other reasons. In 1964, it started accepting boys in the elementary. Three years later the kindergarten program was offered. In the next seventeen years, it had become a co-educational institution with students belonging to different social strata. Thus, additional structures had to be constructed such as the gymnasium. In 1976, the three-storey concrete building for the grade school was erected. Soon after, another two-storey edifice which housed the high school library and the administrative offices were built. More construction of facilities for academic and non-academic purposes followed. In 1978, the school was renamed Assumption School of Davao (ASD).

Programs and Degrees

Basic education

Preschool (Senior Kinder)

Grade school (Grades 1–6)

Junior high school (Grades 7–10)

Modified work and study program (Grades 7–10)

Senior high school (Grades 11–12)

Academic track 
 Accountancy, Business Management (ABM)
 Humanities, Social Sciences (HUMSS)
 Science, Technology, Engineering, Mathematics (STEM)
 General Academic Strand (GAS)

Technical and vocational track 
 Agri-Fishery Arts

– Fish Nursery Operation (NC II)

 Home Economics

– Bread and Pastry Production (NC II)

– Cookery (NC II)

– Food and Beverage Services (NC II)

– Front Office Services (NC II)

– Housekeeping (NC II)

 Information and Communications Technology (ICT)

– Computer Hardware Servicing (NC II)

– Computer Programming (NC IV)

– Animation (NC II)

College Programs

Day and evening classes 

 BS in Business Administration major in Marketing Management
 BS in Social Work
 BEED – Generalist
 BS in Hospitality Management
 BS in Information Technology
 BSED – Biological Science
 BSED – English
 BSED – Mathematics
 BSED – Values Education

School Campus

Queen of the Angels building 

The Queen of the Angels building is a three-storey building that houses the preschool, grade school and some junior high school rooms. Facilities of this building include the speech laboratory,  computer laboratories, restrooms, grade school audio-visual room, Home Economics room, Science laboratory and the library. Offices of the principal, grade school faculty room, offices of the grade school psychometrician and guidance counsellor are also located in the building.

Queen of Peace building 

The Queen of Peace is a four-storey building that houses some junior high school and senior high school rooms. The junior high school faculty, academic supervisors' office, speech laboratory, biology laboratory, chemistry laboratory, physics laboratory, integrated science laboratory, home economics room, computer laboratories, the school clinic, high school audio-visual room, chapel, Human Resource Office, and the Community Extension Services coordinator's office are found in this building.

Queen of the Prophets building 
The Queen of the Prophets is a five-storey building that houses the office of the registrar, finance department room, college and high school libraries. This building also has a roof deck.

Queen of the Universe building 
The Queen of the Universe building is a five-storey building and was inaugurated in 2016. It houses the senior high school rooms, home economics room, a senior high school library, office of the school president, external communications office, board room and the office of research and planning officer. It is also the school's first building that features restrooms for members of the LGBT community, and for the PWDs. The building also contains an auditorium, which is located on the rooftop.

Queen of the Apostles building 
The Queen of the Apostles building is the tallest building of the school, used by the college department and its students for academic purposes. It contains rooms for college students, computer laboratories, hotel and restaurant management instructional room and other facilities needed by the students and professors.

Gymnasium 
The school has a gymnasium used for school events and activities, programs, and sports.

Canteen and Convent 
A building houses a school-operated canteen and the convent for the Missionaries of the Assumption.

Student life

Events and Programs 
 Fiesta Intramurals – is an annual major school event held every August to commemorate the feast of the Our Lady of the Assumption, who is the school's patroness. It is a three-day event, with a holy eucharistic celebration celebrated on the first day and rest of the planned activities are held on the remaining days. In this event, the school is divided into four team colors namely, blue, red, yellow and orange. These four teams battle in different contests and competitions from sports to intellectual games.
 Speechkuhan – an annual major school event held every December wherein students showcase their performances related to Christmas or speech. It is a combination of Paskuhan and Speechfest. 
 Sama-Sama – is an annual major school event held every February wherein the students, employees and selected parents present performances related to the event's theme. Visitors from selected schools would also take part in some of the activities. It is a three-day event; a holy mass is celebrated on the first day. Ground demonstrations and other activities are held on the remaining days. 
 Monthly Holy Mass – The school conducts monthly holy eucharist celebrations wherein the whole school community is called to join this monthly celebration. Being an institution established by Catholic nuns and continually run by the Missionaries of the Assumption, it is therefore significant to conduct such masses.

Athletics 
The Assumption College of Davao has been very active in athletics and has joined different athletic contests from the divisional, regional and even in the national level. The school is known for its excellence in sports, especially in basketball. ACD has joined in athletic meets, such as the Davao Association of Catholic Schools (DACS) Sportsfest held every September, the Davao City Athletic Association (DCAA) Meet, the Davao Regional Athletics Association (DAVRAA) Meet, and the Palarong Pambansa.

Advocacies 
Assumption College of Davao (ACD) being part of CEAP took up the challenge to make the education relevant and responsive to community needs and social realities. With this, we aim to advance academic excellence alongside a strong social orientation and passion towards an education that transforms society. Its advocacies and stance on social issues is its imperative function to attain this challenge.

ACD formulated its own advocacies and programs in line with its rearticulated Vision-Mission-Goals (VMG) and its Characteristics of the Assumptionist. These are incorporated into its curriculum across key learning areas. ACD's transformative educational agenda are aligned to its vision of a society that is just, humane, nationalist, democratic, peaceful, faith motivated, and interconnected with the totality of God's creation. The identified advocacies impart with our students social responsibility as a core practice in our education so that they can develop both the passion and the skill to help transform society into one that is genuinely democratic, productive, sustainable, peaceful and just.

Women at the helm
 Sr. Elodie Richard, fma
 Sr. Lorraine Gallant, fma
 Sr. Lourdes Abapo, fma
 Dr. Ma. Iris A. Melliza
 Mrs. Ma. Mercedes P. Buduan
 Sr. Concepcion P. Gasang, m.a.
 Sr. Aurea E. Quiñones, m.a.
 Sr. Milagros L. Gimeno, m.a.
 Sister Eufrocina Bandigan, m.a.
 The current ACD President is Sr. Marietta B. Banayo, m.a.

References

External links
 http://www.assumptiondavao.edu.ph/acd2/

Catholic universities and colleges in the Philippines
Catholic elementary schools in the Philippines
Catholic secondary schools in the Philippines
Universities and colleges in Davao City
Schools in Davao City
Educational institutions established in 1958
1958 establishments in the Philippines